The Marsh River, located in Minnesota, is a  tributary of the Red River of the North. The Marsh River flows entirely within Norman County.

Marsh River was named for the wetlands near the stream.

See also
List of rivers of Minnesota
List of Hudson Bay rivers

References

Minnesota Watersheds
USGS Hydrologic Unit Map - State of Minnesota (1974)

Rivers of Minnesota
Tributaries of Hudson Bay
Rivers of Norman County, Minnesota